Dickendorf is a municipality in the district of Altenkirchen, in Rhineland-Palatinate, Germany.  Abutting a vast forest area, it is located in the Westerwald (literally "Western Forest") which is a low mountain range on the right bank of the river Rhine. The river Elbbach flows through this town.

Dickendorf is the international headquarters of Sabbath Rest Advent Church.

References

Altenkirchen (district)